The Margaritaville Casino and Restaurant is a closed casino and restaurant in Biloxi, Mississippi in the United States. The  property is in the "Back Bay" area of Biloxi.  It opened on May 22, 2012 and closed on September 15, 2014. Its brand was licensed from Jimmy Buffett's Margaritaville.

History
Jimmy Buffett, a native of nearby Pascagoula, tried to bring the Margaritaville brand to Biloxi as early as 2000, when discussions were held on building a hotel and amphitheater on 12 acres of beachfront land between the Casino Magic and Grand Casino.

Following Hurricane Katrina, Grand Casinos founder Tom Brosig came out of retirement and began looking for land to develop a casino, citing a desire to help rebuild the community. He settled on the Back Bay site where the Margaritaville Casino would ultimately open. According to Brosig, he nearly reached an agreement to use the Margaritaville brand in 2006.

Buffett instead joined with Harrah's Entertainment in 2007 to begin construction on the $700-million Margaritaville Casino Resort on the site of the Casino Magic and Grand Casino, which had both been destroyed by Katrina. Buffett was partly motivated by a desire to help the region's economic recovery from Katrina. Construction was suspended, however, in 2008, due to the global financial crisis and Harrah's near-bankruptcy after being taken private.

Meanwhile, Brosig continued his efforts on the Back Bay site, but had difficulty raising financing due to the financial crisis and the Deepwater Horizon oil spill. He was eventually able to assemble a total investment of $63 million, with "20 or 22" equity investors. A 20-year agreement was reached for the Margaritaville brand.

Groundbreaking was expected in April 2011 with a construction time of 9 months.

In March 2011, plans for the location won fast track approval from the city of Biloxi. On April 7, Buffett appeared before the Mississippi Gaming Commission and explained why the casino should be approved.  Commissioners listened and then approved the project.

On May 22, 2012, the Margaritaville Casino & Restaurant opened to the public, featuring 820 slot machines, 18 table games, two levels of dining decks, and a marina with waterside entertainment, food, and drinks.

In June 2013, Margaritaville Biloxi became the first casino in Mississippi gaming history to offer outdoor gaming which includes three blackjack tables at LandShark Landing and Marina.

In December 2013, Doug Shipley, President & CEO, announced that Margaritaville Biloxi would break ground on a new hotel facility in the spring with anticipated completion a year later. The new hotel would feature 250 rooms, including 170 deluxe guest rooms and 80 two- and three-bedroom suites. In addition, they would offer timeshare units through a major international partner.

In July 2014, the casino announced that it would likely close by September, because of an unresolved dispute with the landlord that was blocking the financing needed to build the hotel.  On September 15, 2014, Margaritaville Biloxi officially closed.

The property was listed for sale in 2015 with an asking price of $18 million.

In 2019, a new group of developers filed plans to reopen the casino as the Biloxi House at Point Cadet. Their $200-million project would add a 300-room hotel and various other amenities to the site.

References

Casinos in Mississippi
Resorts in Mississippi
Buildings and structures in Biloxi, Mississippi
Defunct casinos in the United States
2014 disestablishments in Mississippi
Casinos completed in 2012
Casino and Restaurant
Companies that filed for Chapter 11 bankruptcy in 2014